Robert David Levin (born October 13, 1947) is an American classical pianist, musicologist and composer, and served as the artistic director of the Sarasota Music Festival from 2007 to 2017.

Education

Born in Brooklyn, Levin attended the Brooklyn Friends School and Andrew Jackson High School, and spent his junior year studying music with Nadia Boulanger in Paris. He attended Harvard, where he earned his Bachelor of Arts magna cum laude in 1968 with a thesis entitled The Unfinished Works of W. A. Mozart.

Levin took private lessons at Chatham Square Music School, Conservatoire National de Musique and the Fontainebleau School of Music in:
 piano, with Jan Gorbaty, Louis Martin, Alice Gaultier-Léon, Jean Casadesus, Clifford Curzon and Robert Casadesus
 organ, with Nadia Boulanger
 solfège, with Seymour Bernstein, Louis Martin and Annette Dieudonné
 counterpoint, with Suzanne Bloch and Nadia Boulanger
 composition, with Stefan Wolpe
 conducting, with Eleazar de Carvalho

Academic career

After graduating from Harvard, Levin was named head of the theory department at the Curtis Institute of Music. He was subsequently appointed associate professor of music and coordinator of theory instruction at the SUNY Purchase, and full professor in 1975. From 1986 to 1993, he served as professor of piano at the Hochschule für Musik Freiburg in Germany. In 1993 he became professor of music at his alma mater, Harvard University, where he remains Professor Emeritus. In 1994 he was made Dwight P. Robinson Jr Professor of the Humanities at Harvard, and was a head tutor from 1998 to 2004. In 2012, as Humanitas Visiting Professor of chamber music at Centre for Research in the Arts, Social Sciences and Humanities (CRASSH), University of Cambridge, he gave two lectures, Improvising Mozart and Composing Mozart and a concert with Academy of Ancient Music.

Levin's academic career has included teaching and tutoring performance practice (especially involving keyboard instruments and conducting, with an emphasis on the Classical period) in addition to music history and theory. He currently holds the position of Hogwood Fellow with the Academy of Ancient Music.

Contributions to composition

Levin has completed or reconstructed a number of eighteenth-century works, especially unfinished compositions by Mozart and Johann Sebastian Bach.

His completions of several unfinished Mozart works, including the Requiem in D minor and Great Mass in C minor, are considered his most important achievements. In the Mozart Requiem, he reconstructed an "Amen" fugue from Mozart's own sketches. John Eliot Gardiner commissioned him to write missing orchestral parts to five movements of cantatas by Johann Sebastian Bach, such as Ach! ich sehe, itzt, da ich zur Hochzeit gehe. As a performer, he is best known as soloist in Classical-era piano concertos in general, and those of Mozart and Beethoven in particular, in which he robustly re-creates performance practice of the composers' time such as by improvising cadenzas and shorter embellishments in the composers' style.

Levin has composed several works, including the following:
 Two clarinet sonatas (1961; 1967–68)
 Two Short Piano Pieces (1966–67)
 Bassoon Sonata (1965–66)
 Woodwind Quintet (1965)
 Piano Quartet (1964–65)
 Piano Sonata (1962)

Awards
 Prix Lili Boulanger in 1966 and 1971
 Bach Medal (2018)

Completions and reconstructions of fragments by Mozart
 Requiem in D minor K. 626 (also historically completed by Franz Xaver Süssmayr)
 Mass in C minor ("The Great") K. 427
 Larghetto and Allegro in E-flat major for two pianos K. deest (also historically completed by Maximilian Stadler and Paul Badura-Skoda)
 Rondo in A major for basset clarinet and string quartet, K. 581a
 Allegro in B-flat major for basset clarinet and string quartet, K. 516c
 Allegro in B-flat major for keyboard, K. 400 (also historically completed by Maximilian Stadler)
 Allegro in G minor for keyboard, K. 312 (also historically completed by an unknown composer)
 Suite in C major for keyboard, K. 399: Sarabande
 Concerto for Violin and Piano K. Anh. 56/315f
 Horn Concerto in D major, K. 412 (also historically completed by Franz Xaver Süssmayr)
 Rondo for horn and orchestra in E-flat major K. 371
 Sinfonia Concertante for oboe, clarinet, horn and bassoon K. 297b (reconstruction of possible original version for flute, oboe, horn, and bassoon)

Recordings 
 Ludwig van Beethoven. Cello Sonatas. Robert Levin with Steven Isserlis. Hyperion Records Limited
 Ludwig van Beethoven. Piano Concertos. Robert Levin with Orchestre Revolutionnaire et Romantique, John Eliot Gardiner. Archiv Produktion
 Wolfgang Amadeus Mozart. Piano Concertos K271 & K414. Robert Levin with The Academy of Ancient Music, Christopher Hogwood. Played on a Walter fortepiano replica by Paul McNulty. Éditions de l'Oiseau-Lyre 
 Wolfgang Amadeus Mozart. Piano Concertos K453 & K466. Robert Levin with The Academy of Ancient Music, Christopher Hogwood. Éditions de l'Oiseau-Lyre
 Wolfgang Amadeus Mozart. Piano Concertos K456 & K459. Robert Levin with The Academy of Ancient Music, Christopher Hogwood. Éditions de l'Oiseau-Lyre
 Wolfgang Amadeus Mozart. The Piano Sonatas. Robert Levin. Played on Mozart's own piano by Anton Walter. ECM New Series.
 Franz Joseph Haydn. The Last 4 Piano Trios: H 15 no 27-30. Robert Levin with Vera Beths and Anner Bylsma. SC Vivarte Series 53120
 Henri Dutilleux. D'ombre et de silence (Piano Sonata, Preludes, etc.). ECM New Series 2105
Johann Sebastian Bach. Keyboard Works. Robert Levin, Trevor Pinnock, Robert Hill, Peter Watchorn, Edward Aldwell, Evgeni Koroliov. Played on an antique harpsichord and organ. Label: Hanssler Classic.
Franz Schubert. Piano Sonatas. Robert Levin. Played on Johann Fritz 1825 fortepiano. Sony Classical.  
Franz Schubert. Complete Piano Trios. Noah Bendix-Balgley (violin), Peter Wiley (cello). Le Palais des Dégustateurs
J.S. Bach. Six Partitas BWV 825 - 830. Le Palais des Dégustateurs.
 Wolfgang Amadeus Mozart. Trio in G major K 496. Three unfinished movements for trio K 442 completed by Robert Levin. Robert Levin (piano) - Hilary Hahn (violin) - Alain Meunier (cello).  Le Palais des Dégustateurs

References

External links
"Musician with a Mission" by Janet Tassel, Harvard Magazine May–June 1995, pp. 32–39
Profile, Rayfield Allied
The Improvisational Brain, Seed article about improvisation, heavily featuring Levin
Derek Bailey's documentary On The Edge – Improvisation in Music (1991), Levin and Christopher Hogwood

1947 births
Living people
Musicians from Brooklyn
Classical musicians from New York (state)
Brooklyn Friends School alumni
Harvard College alumni
Curtis Institute of Music faculty
State University of New York at Purchase faculty
Academic staff of the Hochschule für Musik Freiburg
American classical pianists
Male classical pianists
American male pianists
20th-century American pianists
21st-century American pianists
Fortepianists
American musicologists
Jewish musicologists
Mozart scholars
20th-century classical composers
20th-century American composers
Andrew Jackson High School (Queens) alumni